Marlene R. Cohen is a neuroscientist at the University of Pittsburgh and an Associate Director of the Center for the Neural Basis of Cognition, a joint venture between the University of Pittsburgh and Carnegie Mellon University. Her team investigates how visual information is encoded in groups of neurons and used to guide behavior. She is recognized for pioneering use of multielectrode array recording to determine that the improved behavioral performance associated with redirecting spatial attention has a neural correlate in the brain that is reflected by reduced correlated activity between neurons. Cohen has also demonstrated that this same mechanism happens during learning. She has received several awards for her work, including the Troland Research Award from the National Academy of Sciences in 2018

Selected awards 

 Klingenstein Fellowship Award in the Neurosciences (2012). 
 Eppendorf & Science Prize for Neurobiology, grand prize winner (2012).
 McKnight Scholar Award (2015).
Troland Research Award from the National Academy of Sciences (2018).

References

External links
Profile, University of Pittsburgh

American neuroscientists
University of Pittsburgh faculty
Stanford University alumni
Harvard University alumni
Massachusetts Institute of Technology alumni
American women neuroscientists
Living people
Year of birth missing (living people)
Place of birth missing (living people)
American women academics
21st-century American women